Nýřany is a town in Plzeň-North District in the Plzeň Region of the Czech Republic. It has about 6,900 inhabitants.

Administrative parts
Villages of Doubrava and Kamenný Újezd are administrative parts of Nýřany.

Geography
It lies in the Plasy Uplands. The Vejprnický Stream flows through the town.

History
The first written mention of Nýřany is from 1272. The village was promoted to a town by Emperor Franz Joseph I on 29 January 1892.

The village of Kamenný Újezd was first mentioned in 1215 and Doubrava in 1556.

Around 1830, black coal deposits were discovered. The start of mining meant the rapid development of the village, and new people arrived. The peak of mining was in 1880, when 9,300 people was employed in about 40 mines. The mining ended in 1995. Those mines sometimes yielded valuable well-preserved fossils of early amphibians.

During World War II the town of Nýřany was a part of Sudetenland. Near the end of the war one transport of death was surprised by an airstrike and about hundred of prisoners managed to escape. They were chased by SS-Guards and local Germans and either killed on the spot or executed at the place called Humboldtka.

Demographics

Transport
The D5 motorway passes through the southern part of the municipal territory.

The Plzeň–Domažlice railway is passing through the town. Local railway that leads to Heřmanova Huť starts here.

Sights

The most important monument is the Church of Saint Procopius in the middle of the town square. It was built in the pseudo-Gothic style in 1903–1904.

The Neo-Renaissance town hall was built in 1885–1886. It was built before Nýřany became a town. Until the church was built, the building was also used for religious services. The Monument of Shot Miners stands in front of the town hall. It commemorates an incident when 13 miners were shot during the 1890 strike.

Chapel of Saint Wenceslaus was built in the 18th century on the site of a former chapel from 1595.

Notable people
Anna Letenská (1904–1942), actress

Twin towns – sister cities

Nýřany is twinned with:
 Zeulenroda-Triebes, Germany

References

External links

Cities and towns in the Czech Republic
Populated places in Plzeň-North District